This article shows past squads from the Dominican professional volleyball team Mirador Volleyball.

2004

 Dominican Republic Distrito Nacional Superior Tournament Squad
 Head Coach:  Héctor Romero
 Assistant Coach:  Wilson Sánchez
 Champions

2005

 Dominican Republic Metrolitan League Squad
 Head Coach:  Héctor Romero
 Assistant Coach:  Wilson Sánchez
 The team reached semifinals

2006

 Dominican Republic Metrolitan League Squad
 Head Coach:  Wilson Sánchez 
 League Championship

2008 CDN Mirador
 2008 Salonpas Cup
 CDN Mirador (Club Deportivo Nacional Mirador
 Head Coach: Marcos Kwiek

2010
NORCECA representative at the 2010 FIVB Women's Club World Championship squad. The team ranked 4th.
As of December 2010
 Head Coach:  Marcos Kwiek
 Assistant coach:  Wagner Pacheco

2011
NORCECA representative at the 2011 FIVB Women's Club World Championship squad. 
 Head Coach:  Wilson Sánchez
 Assistant coach:  Cristian Cruz

References

External links
 Dominican Republic Volleyball Federation

Mirador